Lin Yushan (1 April 1907 – 20 August 2004), originally named Lin Yinggui, was a Taiwanese visual artist.

Early life 
Lin was raised in a family-owned picture framing store. Lin grew up with an early passion for painting, and his first instructors were folk painters hired by his family. He also spent much of his early years learning from artists such as Tan Ting-pho and Isaka Kyokko.

Education
Between 1926 and 1929, he lived in Japan and studied Oriental painting at the Kawabata Painting School. In 1927, his works Water Buffalo and Southern Gate were selected for the 1st  (Taiten), where, together with Chen Jin and Guo Xuehu, he became known as one of the “Taiten’s Up-and-Coming Talents”. After this, he was selected in each subsequent year of the Taiten. His works Lotus Pond, Sugar Cane, and Evening Glow were named as special selections for the 4th, 6th, and 7th Taitens, respectively.

Work and public life
Aside from participating in exhibitions, he also actively participated in various types of painting societies such as Chiayi's Chun-Meng Painting Society, Crow Society, Mo-Yang Painting Group, and the Zili Society, as well as Northern painting societies like the “Sandalwood Association” and the “Liguang Society”.

In order to advance his art Lin went back to Kyoto to continue advanced studies at Insho Domoto's Art School Tokyusha from 1935 to 1936. During this time, he imitated the styles of Song dynasty painters and became better acquainted with Chinese painting.

Starting in 1938, he drew illustrations for serialized novels in newspapers and popular fiction books. The illustrations for Yang Kui’s interpretations of Records of the Three Kingdoms and Journey to the West were among Lin's famous works. In 1946, he served as a juror for the Chinese Painting Section of the 1st Taiwan Provincial Art Exhibition.

In 1972, after gouache paintings were removed from the Taiwan Provincial Art Exhibitions, he and some other gouache painters formed the “Chang Liu Painting Society”. In addition to his creative work, Lin also contributed to the education of new artistic talents. He taught at Provincial Chiayi Senior High School and Blessed Imelda's School. In 1951, he was hired by the Art Department of National Taiwan Normal University, where he stayed until his retirement in 1977.

Contributions to art

Lin promoted en plein air painting, which he considered an important foundation of painting. His work centered thematically on bird-and-flower, landscapes, and figures. Before 1946, most of his works used a fine-brush technique. Afterwards, he shifted toward a more freehand style while continuing to use fine-brush techniques. Among Lin's works, some are characterized by abstraction, such as 1966's Ivy. In addition to his paintings, Lin also wrote reflections on his creative experiences and life as an artist. His written works include 1955's “Vicissitudes of the Way of Art”, 1964's “A Study of Bird-and-Flower Painting”, and 1968's “An Outline of the Beginning of Chinese Painting”.

See also
Taiwanese art

References

External links
 Starting Out from 23.5°N: Chen Cheng-po, Academia Sinica Digital Center (ASDC)
National Repository of Cultural Heritage
National Taiwan Museum of Fine Arts

1907 births
2004 deaths
Taiwanese painters
Taiwanese people of Hoklo descent
20th-century Taiwanese painters
People from Chiayi